IZO-Narkompros was the Department of Fine Arts of the People's Commissariat for Education established after the Bolshevik seizure of power in Russia 1917. It was established in Petrograd (St Petersburg) on 29 January 1918.

An Arts Board (Khudozhestvennaya kollegiya) was set up to run the organisation:
 David Shterenberg (president) – painter
 Nathan Altman – painter, stage designer and book illustrator.
 Sergey Chekhonin – graphic artist,[2] portrait miniaturist, ceramicist, and illustrator
 Alexei Karev – painter, graphic artist
 Aleksandr Matveyev – sculptor
 Nikolai Punin – art scholar
 Peter Vaulin – ceramicist
 Gregory Yatmanov
In the summer of 1918 the board was increased:
 Vladimir Baranov-Rossine
 Osip Brik
 Iosif Shkolnik – painter
 Vladimir Mayakovsky
 Lev Ilyin
 Vladimir Dubenetsky
 Lev Rudnev
 Ernests Štālbergs
 Vladimir Shchuko.

IZO organised twenty‐one art exhibitions between 1918 and 1921.

References

1918 establishments in Russia
Education in the Soviet Union
Soviet culture